Alex Whitmore Brooks (born August 21, 1976) is an American former professional ice hockey defenseman who played, as an undrafted player, 19 games in the National Hockey League for the New Jersey Devils in the 2006–07 season.

Playing career
Undrafted and out of college from the University of Wisconsin, Brooks took his game to Jokerit of the Finnish First League. The New Jersey Devils, attracted to Brooks' tough defensive play, signed the defenseman to an entry-level contract. Brooks spent four years with the Devils' minor league affiliate, the Albany River Rats. When veteran center Pascal Rheaume was traded, Brooks was named captain, and held that post even after the team relocated to Lowell.

In the 2006–07 season, when several Devils were injured, including Colin White, Johnny Oduya, and Brad Lukowich, Brooks was called up, playing 19 games and scoring 1 assist to go along with 4 PIM. Then, in a game against the St. Louis Blues, Brooks broke his foot, and was subsequently sent back to Lowell, and was replaced by Andy Greene. He returned to Lowell and regained his post as captain. Andy Greene flourished, and thus, Brooks was left in Lowell.

On August 9, 2007, Brooks signed on with the St. Louis Blues. However, with chances limited, Brooks provided a veteran presence in Peoria, the Blues minor league squad.  He played one season with the Chicago Wolves of the AHL before returning to Finland and Jokerit for the 2009–10 season.

Brooks played his final professional season with Karlskrona HK of the Swedish Division 1 in 2010–11 before retiring and joining the Chicago Blackhawks staff as a pro scout.

Career statistics

Regular season and playoffs

Awards and honors

References

External links

1976 births
Albany River Rats players
American men's ice hockey defensemen
Chicago Blackhawks scouts
Green Bay Gamblers players
Ice hockey people from Wisconsin
Jokerit players
Karlskrona HK players
Living people
Lowell Devils players
New Jersey Devils players
Sportspeople from Madison, Wisconsin
Undrafted National Hockey League players
Wisconsin Badgers men's ice hockey players
Ice hockey players from Wisconsin